was a Japanese hurdler. He competed in the men's 110 metres hurdles at the 1928 Summer Olympics.

References

External links
 

1905 births
Year of death missing
Place of birth missing
Japanese male hurdlers
Japanese male high jumpers
Olympic male hurdlers
Olympic athletes of Japan
Athletes (track and field) at the 1928 Summer Olympics
Japan Championships in Athletics winners
20th-century Japanese people